This is a selected list of authors and works listed on the Index Librorum Prohibitorum. The Index was discontinued on June 14, 1966 by Pope Paul VI.

A complete list of the authors and writings present in the subsequent editions of the index are listed in J. Martinez de Bujanda, Index Librorum Prohibitorum, 1600–1966, Geneva, 2002.

The Index includes entries for single or multiple works by an author, all works by an author in a given genre or dealing with a given topic.  The scope of the prohibition is defined by a Latin phrase in the Index:
 Omnia opera dramatica: all plays
 Omnes fabulae amatoriae: all novels, or romances
 Opera omnia theologica: all theological works
 Opera omnia: all works (see note below)

The Index includes entries banning all works of a particular writer.  Most of these were inserted in the Index at a time when the Index itself stated that the prohibition of someone's "opera omnia" (all his works) did not cover works whose contents did not concern religion and were not forbidden by the general rules of the Index, but this explanation was omitted in the 1929 edition, an omission that was officially interpreted in 1940 as meaning that thenceforth "opera omnia" covered all the author's works without exception.

List of authors and works in the final edition, with later additions
This is a selected list of the authors and works appearing in the final published edition of the Index in 1948, with later additions until the Index was discontinued in 1966.

Reversals and non-inclusions
There have been cases of reversal with respect to works that were on the Index, such as those of Nicolaus Copernicus and Galileo Galilei. The Inquisition's ban on reprinting Galileo's works was lifted in 1718 when permission was granted to publish an edition of his works (excluding the condemned Dialogue) in Florence. In 1741 Pope Benedict XIV authorised the publication of an edition of Galileo's complete scientific works which included a mildly censored version of the Dialogue. In 1758 the general prohibition against works advocating heliocentrism was removed from the Index of prohibited books, although the specific ban on uncensored versions of the Dialogue and Copernicus's De Revolutionibus remained. All traces of official opposition to heliocentrism by the church disappeared in 1835 when these works were finally dropped from the Index.

Not on the Index were Aristophanes, Juvenal, John Cleland, James Joyce and D. H. Lawrence. According to Wallace et al., this was because the primary criterion for banning the work was anticlericalism, blasphemy and heresy.

Some authors whose views are generally unacceptable to the Church (e.g. Karl Marx) were never put on the Index; nor was Charles Darwin (see Evolution and the Roman Catholic Church).

Works that were included in the Index, and later removed, include:

 Libri Carolini, supposedly by Charlemagne
 Rabelais
 Allan Kardec (The Spirits Book)

Beacon results

Notes

References

External links

 Searchable database of Index Librorum Prohibitorum at Beacon for Freedom of Expression
 Facsimile of the 1559 index 
 The complete list of banned books in 1948
 List of famous authors in the index

Book censorship
Lists of controversial books
Lists of prohibited books
Latin Church
Index Librorum Prohibitorum